Donal Gibson is an American actor and the younger brother of award-winning actor/director Mel Gibson.

Biography 
Gibson was born in Peekskill, New York. He has done voice acting in television shows such as ReBoot and Justice League Unlimited. His most notable voice acting role was as Captain John Smith in Disney's Pocahontas II: Journey to a New World, a role which was played by his brother Mel in the first film, Pocahontas.

Aside of voice acting, Donal has also appeared for  roles in films starring his brother Mel, such as Maverick, Braveheart, and Conspiracy Theory, as well as major motion pictures not starring his brother such as The Punisher, Fatal Bond and Immortal Beloved.

Donal also holds a United States patent for a type of CD packaging and is a contemporary artist.

Filmography

Movies

Television

References

External links 

1958 births
20th-century American actors
20th-century American male actors
21st-century American actors
21st-century American male actors
American male film actors
American male television actors
American male voice actors
American people of Australian descent
American people of Irish descent
Living people
People from Peekskill, New York
Donal
www.ResurrectionByDonalGibson.com